Abram is a male given name of Biblical Hebrew origin, meaning exalted father in much later languages. In the Bible, it was originally the name of the first of the three Biblical patriarchs, who later became known as Abraham.

Russian name
The Russian language borrowed the name from Byzantine Christianity, but its popularity, along with other Biblical first names, declined by the mid-19th century. The forms used by the Russian Orthodox church were "" (Avraam), "" (Avraamy), and "" (Avramy), but "" (Abram) remained a popular colloquial variant. Other colloquial forms included "" (Abramy), "" (Avram), and "" (Obram). Until the end of the 19th century, the official Synodal Menologium also included the form "" (Abrakham).

The patronymics derived from "Abram" are "" (Abramovich; masculine) and its colloquial form "" (Abramych), and "" (Abramovna; feminine). The patronymics derived from "Abramy" are "" (Abramiyevich; masculine) and "" (Abramiyevna; feminine). The patronymics derived from "Avraam" are "" (Avraamovich; masculine) and "" (Avraamovna; feminine). The patronymics derived from "Avraamy" are "" (Avraamiyevich; masculine) and "" (Avraamiyevna; feminine). The patronymics derived from "Avram" are "" (Avramovich; masculine) and "" (Avramovna; feminine). The patronymics derived from "Avraamy" are "" (Avraamiyevich; masculine) and "" (Avraamiyevna; feminine).

The diminutives of "Avraam" and "Avraamy" include "" (Avraamka), "" (Avramka), "" (Avraakha), "" (Avrakha), "" (Avraasha), and "" (Avrasha). The diminutives of "Abram" include "" (Abramka), "" (Abrakha), and "" (Abrasha). The diminutives of "Avram" include "" (Avramka), "" (Avrakha), "" (Avrasha), and "" (Ava).

People with the given name Abram
Abram Piatt Andrew (Jr.) (1873–1936), United States Representative from Massachusetts
Abram Samoilovich Besicovitch (Bezikovich) (1891–1970), Russian mathematician
Abram Blass (born 1895), Polish-Israeli chess master
Abram Bergson (1914–2003), American economist
Abram Chasins (1903–1987), American composer, pianist, piano teacher, lecturer, musicologist, music broadcaster, radio executive and author
Abram Comingo (1820–1889), Democratic Representative
Abram Duryée (1815–1890), Union Army general
Abram Elam (born 1981), American football safety
Abram Fulkerson (1834–1902), Confederate officer
Abram Petrovich Gannibal (1696–1781), Afro-Russian nobleman, military engineer and general of Ethiopian origin
Abram Grushko (1918–1980), Russian painter and art teacher
Abram Lincoln Harris (1899–1963), African American economist, academic, and anthropologist
Abram Harrison (1898–1979), politician
Abram Stevens Hewitt (1822–1903), teacher, lawyer, iron manufacturer, and chairman
Abram Hoffer (1917–2009), Canadian psychiatrist
Abram Jakira (1889–1931), American socialist political activist, newspaper editor, and Communist Party functionary
Abram Fedorovich Ioffe (1860–1960), prominent Russian/Soviet physicist
Abram Lyle (1820-1891), Scottish businessman
Abram F. Myers (born 1889), chair of the Federal Trade Commission and later general counsel and board chairman of the Allied States Association of Motion Picture Exhibitors
Abram Rabinovich (1878–1943), Lithuanian–Russian chess master
(Abram) Harding "Hardy" Richardson (1855–1931), second baseman and outfielder
Abram Joseph Ryan (1839–1886), American poet, proponent of the Confederate States of America, and Roman Catholic priest
 Abram Saperstein, changed his name to Albert Sabin (1906–1993), Polish-American medical researcher who developed an oral polio vaccine; President of the Weizmann Institute of Science 
Abram Smith (disambiguation), multiple people
Abram Trigg (born 1750), American farmer and politician

Variant forms
Abraham (Avraham, Avrohom, also Avrohum, Avrohim, Avruhom, Avrihom, Avruhum, Ibrahim), list of people
Avram (Avrom, Avrum)
Abrams
Abramson, Abramsson
Abramov, and Abramowicz (Abramovich, Abramowitz), etc. (Slavic, Russianised form)
Abramczyk (surname)
Abraomas, Abromaitis (surname), Abrameit, Abromeit (Baltic forms)
Bram, Brams, Brahm, Brahms, etc.
(not to be confused with the Hindu word Brahman)
Abiram, another Hebrew-origin given name

See also

Abram (surname)

References

Notes

Sources
В. А. Никонов (V. A. Nikonov). "Ищем имя" (Looking for a Name). Изд. "Советская Россия". Москва, 1988. 
Н. А. Петровский (N. A. Petrovsky). "Словарь русских личных имён" (Dictionary of Russian First Names). ООО Издательство "АСТ". Москва, 2005. 
[1] А. В. Суперанская (A. V. Superanskaya). "Современный словарь личных имён: Сравнение. Происхождение. Написание" (Modern Dictionary of First Names: Comparison. Origins. Spelling). Айрис-пресс. Москва, 2005. 
[2] А. В. Суперанская (A. V. Superanskaya). "Словарь русских имён" (Dictionary of Russian Names). Издательство Эксмо. Москва, 2005. 

Hebrew masculine given names
Russian masculine given names